Paramorbia is a genus of moths belonging to the family Tortricidae.

Species
Paramorbia aureocastanea Razowski & Wojtusiak, 2006
Paramorbia chionophthalma (Meyrick, 1932)
Paramorbia ithyclina (Meyrick, 1926)
Paramorbia rostellana (Zeller, 1877)

See also
List of Tortricidae genera

References

 , 1986, Pan-Pacif. Ent. 64: 379.
 , 2005, World Catalogue of Insects, 5

External links
tortricidae.com

Sparganothini
Tortricidae genera